Ángel Menchaca (March 1, 1855 – May 8, 1924) was an Argentine music theorist of Paraguayan birth.

Born in Asunción, Menchaca was of Basque extraction. Trained for a career in the law, he taught history and literature in Buenos Aires. In 1914 he published Nuevo sistema teórico-gráfico de la música, which suggested a new system of musical notation based on a 12-note alphabet instead of traditionally-used notes and staffs. The system was the subject of a lecture tour which he gave throughout Europe; he also invented a special keyboard which was meant to use it. A composer as well, he wrote songs and choral music for use in schools, among other works. He died in Buenos Aires.

References

1855 births
1924 deaths
Music theorists
Argentine musicologists
20th-century musicologists
People from Asunción
Paraguayan emigrants to Argentina
Argentine people of Basque descent
19th-century musicologists